Arshaq-e Markazi Rural District is in Arshaq District of Meshgin Shahr County, Ardabil province, Iran. At the census of 2006, its population was 5,215 in 1,111 households; there were 4,083 inhabitants in 1,045 households at the following census of 2011; and in the most recent census of 2016, the population of the rural district was 4,478 in 1,399 households. The largest of its 59 villages was Rahim Beyglui-ye Sofla, with 376 people.

References 

Meshgin Shahr County

Rural Districts of Ardabil Province

Populated places in Ardabil Province

Populated places in Meshgin Shahr County